The East Timor Trade Union Confederation (TLTUC/KSTL) is the main trade union in East Timor.  It was formed in 2001 with the support of the ITUC, the ILO, and Australian trade unions.

References

Trade unions in East Timor
Trade unions established in 2001
2001 establishments in East Timor